The following outline is provided as an overview of and topical guide to James Bond:

James Bond is a fictional character created in 1953 by the journalist and writer Ian Fleming, who featured him in twelve novels and two short story collections. The character has also been used in the long-running and fifth most financially successful English-language film series to date. The film series started in 1962 with Dr. No, starring Sean Connery as James Bond, and has continued with other actors.

Characters

 James Bond (literary character)
 Inspirations for James Bond
 James Bond Jr.
 Young Bond
 Shaken, not stirred
 Vesper cocktail
 List of actors considered for the James Bond character
 Bond girl

Villains
 List of James Bond villains

Allies
 List of James Bond allies

Novels
List of James Bond novels
 Ian Fleming Publications
 Ian Fleming
 Casino Royale (published in one US edition as You Asked for It)
 Live and Let Die
 Moonraker (published in one US edition as Too Hot to Handle)
 Diamonds Are Forever
 From Russia, with Love
 Dr. No
 Goldfinger
 For Your Eyes Only
 "From a View to a Kill"
 "For Your Eyes Only"
 "Quantum of Solace"
 "Risico"
 "The Hildebrand Rarity"
 Thunderball
 The Spy Who Loved Me
 On Her Majesty's Secret Service
 You Only Live Twice
 The Man with the Golden Gun
 Octopussy and The Living Daylights
 "Octopussy"
 "The Property of a Lady"
 "The Living Daylights"
 "007 in New York"
 Kingsley Amis as Robert Markham
 Colonel Sun
 John Pearson
 James Bond: The Authorized Biography of 007
 Christopher Wood
 James Bond, The Spy Who Loved Me (novelisation)
 James Bond and Moonraker (novelisation)
 John Gardner
 Licence Renewed
 For Special Services
 Icebreaker
 Role of Honour
 Nobody Lives for Ever
 No Deals, Mr. Bond
 Scorpius
 Win, Lose or Die
 Licence to Kill (novelisation)
 Brokenclaw
 The Man from Barbarossa
 Death Is Forever
 Never Send Flowers
 SeaFire
 GoldenEye (novelisation)
 Cold
 Raymond Benson
 Blast from the Past
 Zero Minus Ten
 Tomorrow Never Dies (novelisation)
 The Facts of Death
 "Midsummer Night's Doom"
 Live at Five
 The World Is Not Enough (novelisation)
 High Time to Kill
 DoubleShot
 Never Dream of Dying
 The Man with the Red Tattoo
 Die Another Day (novelisation)
 The Heart of Erzulie
 Charlie Higson (Young Bond)
 SilverFin
 Blood Fever
 Double or Die
 Hurricane Gold
 By Royal Command
 A Hard Man to Kill
 Samantha Weinberg as Kate Westbrook (The Moneypenny Diaries)
 Guardian Angel
 Secret Servant
 Final Fling
 "For Your Eyes Only, James"
 "Moneypenny's First Date with Bond"
 Sebastian Faulks
 Devil May Care
 Jeffery Deaver
 Carte Blanche 
 William Boyd
 Solo
 Steve Cole (Young Bond)
 Shoot to Kill
 Heads You Die
 Strike Lightning
 Red Nemesis
 Anthony Horowitz
 Trigger Mortis, featuring passages by Ian Fleming and based on his plot
 Forever and a Day, prequel to Casino Royale and featuring passages by Ian Fleming
With a Mind to Kill

Related works
 The Diamond Smugglers (1957 book written by Fleming, based on research made for his fourth Bond novel)
 The James Bond Dossier
 The Book of Bond or, Every Man His Own 007
 For Bond Lovers Only
 The James Bond Bedside Companion
 Danger Society: The Young Bond Dossier
 Double O Seven, James Bond, A Report
 The Battle for Bond
 James Bond Encyclopedia
 For Your Eyes Only: Behind the Scenes of the James Bond Films
 Little Nellie 007
 James Bond: The Secret World of 007

Films

 Production of the James Bond films
 Eon Productions
 Sean Connery 
 Dr. No
 From Russia with Love
 Goldfinger
 Thunderball
 You Only Live Twice
 Diamonds Are Forever
 George Lazenby
 On Her Majesty's Secret Service
 Roger Moore
 Live and Let Die
 The Man with the Golden Gun
 The Spy Who Loved Me
 Moonraker
 For Your Eyes Only
 Octopussy
 A View to a Kill
 Timothy Dalton
 The Living Daylights
 Licence to Kill
 Pierce Brosnan
 GoldenEye
 Tomorrow Never Dies
 The World Is Not Enough
 Die Another Day
 Daniel Craig
 Casino Royale
 Quantum of Solace
 Skyfall
 Spectre
 No Time to Die
 Non-Eon films and television episodes
 "Casino Royale" – by CBS for Climax! television series – 1954
 Casino Royale – by Columbia Pictures – 1967
 Never Say Never Again – by Producers Sales Organization (as Taliafilm) – 1983
 List of James Bond films
 Portrayal of James Bond in film
 Motifs in the James Bond film series
 List of James Bond film locations
 Gun barrel sequence
 List of recurring characters in the James Bond film series
 List of recurring actors in the James Bond film series
 Albert R. Broccoli
 Harry Saltzman
 Michael G. Wilson
 Barbara Broccoli

Gadgets, vehicles and equipment
 List of James Bond vehicles
 James Bond Car Collection
 List of James Bond gadgets

Music 
 James Bond music
 John Barry
 David Arnold
 Thomas Newman
 "James Bond Theme"
 Monty Norman
 "James Bond Theme (Moby's re-version)"
 Shaken and Stirred: The David Arnold James Bond Project
 Meets James Bond – Sounds Orchestral, 1965
 Mister James Bond – Jean-Jacques Perrey, 1968
 The Best of Bond... James Bond
 Soundtracks
 Dr. No
 "James Bond Theme"
 From Russia with Love
 Goldfinger
 "Goldfinger"
 Thunderball
 You Only Live Twice
 "You Only Live Twice"
 On Her Majesty's Secret Service
 "We Have All the Time in the World"
 Diamonds Are Forever
 Live and Let Die
 "Live and Let Die"
 The Man with the Golden Gun
 The Spy Who Loved Me
 "Nobody Does It Better"
 Moonraker
 For Your Eyes Only
 "For Your Eyes Only"
 Octopussy
 "All Time High"
 A View to a Kill
 "A View to a Kill"
 The Living Daylights
 "The Living Daylights"
 "Where Has Everybody Gone?"
 Licence to Kill
 "Licence to Kill"
 "If You Asked Me To"
 GoldenEye
 "GoldenEye"
 Tomorrow Never Dies
 "Tomorrow Never Dies"
 The World Is Not Enough
 "The World Is Not Enough"
 Die Another Day
 "Die Another Day"
 Casino Royale
 "You Know My Name"
 Quantum of Solace
 "Another Way to Die"
 Skyfall
 "Skyfall"
 Spectre
 "Writing's On The Wall"
 No Time to Die
 "No Time to Die"

Games

 James Bond (games)
 Video games:
 Shaken but Not Stirred
 James Bond 007
 A View to a Kill
 Goldfinger
 The Living Daylights
 Live and Let Die
 007: Licence to Kill
 The Spy Who Loved Me
 Operation Stealth
 James Bond Jr.
 James Bond 007: The Duel
 GoldenEye (handheld)
 GoldenEye 007
 Goldfinger 64
 James Bond 007 (GB)
 Tomorrow Never Dies
 The World Is Not Enough (N64)
 The World Is Not Enough (PS)
 007 Racing
 The World Is Not Enough (GBC)
 Agent Under Fire
 Nightfire
 Everything or Nothing
 GoldenEye: Rogue Agent
 From Russia with Love
 Quantum of Solace
 GoldenEye 007 (remake)
 Blood Stone
 007 Legends
 James Bond: World of Espionage
 Role-playing game 
 James Bond 007, Role-Playing in Her Majesty's Secret Service
 Card game
 Before I Kill You, Mr. Bond

Parodies, spin-offs and fandom

 GoldenEye: Source
 James Bond Car Collection
 James Bond comics
 James Bond comic strip
 List of James Bond comics
 005
 James Bond Jr.
 The Adventures of James Bond Junior 003½
 List of James Bond Jr. characters
 List of James Bond Jr. episodes
 Video game
 Evil Genius (video game)
 Avakoum Zahov versus 07
 Per Fine Ounce
 The Killing Zone
 "Your Deal, Mr. Bond"
 Night Probe!
 Trading Futures
 Austin Powers
 Austin Powers (character)
 Austin Powers: International Man of Mystery
 Austin Powers: The Spy Who Shagged Me
 Austin Powers in Goldmember
 Carry On Spying
 Hot Enough for June
 Dr. Goldfoot and the Bikini Machine
 Dr. Goldfoot and the Girl Bombs
 Licensed to Kill
 Our Man Flint
 In Like Flint
 Johnny English series
 Johnny English
 Johnny English Reborn
 Johnny English Strikes Again
 Kiss the Girls and Make Them Die
 Kingsman
 Kingsman: The Secret Service
 Kingsman: The Golden Circle
 The Last of the Secret Agents
 O.K. Connery
 Get Smart
 Archer
 The Incredible World of James Bond
 James Bond fandom
 Hot Shots Calendar 0014

See also 
 Bibliography of works on James Bond
 Outline of fiction
 James Bond (literary character), information about the literary character
 Inspirations for James Bond, the people who Ian Fleming used as an inspiration for James Bond
 James Bond in film, for production background of the film series 
 List of James Bond films, for plot synopses, awards, and box office information for each film in the series
 Motifs in the James Bond film series, the motifs that appear in the series of Bond films
 Portrayal of James Bond in film, information about the film character
 James Bond in video games, the series of video and computer games based on the character and the film series
 James Bond music, the music for the James Bond movies
 James Bond (comic strip)
 James Bond (comics)
 The "James Bond Theme", the main theme for the James Bond movies

External links 

 Official James Bond website
 Ian Fleming Publications website
 Young Bond official website
 Pinewood Studios Albert R. Broccoli 007 Stage website 

 
James Bond
James Bond